During the 1952–53 English football season, Brentford competed in the Football League Second Division. A forgettable season, during which Tommy Lawton was appointed as the club's player-manager, ended with a 17th-place finish.

Season summary 

Brentford's 1952–53 pre-season preparations were thrown into disarray by the departure of secretary-manager Jackie Gibbons in August 1952. In his letter of resignation, Gibbons wrote of having failed to see "eye to eye" with the Brentford board. Long-serving assistant manager Jimmy Bain took over as caretaker until a permanent appointment could be made. 34-year-old forward Les Smith was the club's only signing and returned to Griffin Park after six years with Aston Villa. Half backs Bill Slater and forwards Johnny Paton and Jimmy Bowie were the only departures of note.

Brentford had a poor start to the Second Division season and won just five of the opening 20 matches. Four defeats and no wins in a five-match spell in September 1952 led caretaker Bain to break up his settled XI and experiment with moving players into different positions. Want-away captain Ron Greenwood left for First Division club Chelsea in October 1952 and forward Jimmy D'Arcy arrived in part-exchange. The tide began to turn after back to back victories over Barnsley on Christmas Day and Boxing Day. Forward Tommy Lawton was announced as Brentford's player-manager on 2 January 1953 and Jimmy Bain reverted to his role as assistant. Lawton was unbeaten in 9 of his first 12 matches, but the team lost confidence after a pair of heavy defeats in March and slumped to a 17th-place finish.

League table

Results
Brentford's goal tally listed first.

Legend

Football League Second Division

FA Cup

 Sources: 100 Years Of Brentford, Statto, 11v11

Playing squad 
Players' ages are as of the opening day of the 1952–53 season.

 Sources: 100 Years Of Brentford, Timeless Bees

Coaching staff

Jimmy Bain (23 August 1952 – 2 January 1953)

Tommy Lawton (2 January 1953 – 1 May 1953)

Statistics

Appearances and goals

Players listed in italics left the club mid-season.
Source: 100 Years Of Brentford

Goalscorers 

Players listed in italics left the club mid-season.
Source: 100 Years Of Brentford

International caps

Management

Summary

Transfers & loans

References 

Brentford F.C. seasons
Brentford